Mochi are a community, found in North India, Pakistan and Bangladesh.They are the traditional shoemakers of .South Asia.

Origin 

They are mainly Shormakers of Hindus, who chose Islam as their religion during mid 14th to 16th century AD. The community was also involved in the manufacture of protective leather dresses for soldiers and as such were closely associated with army. The word mochi is derived from the Sanskrit mochika, meaning a cobbler. Traditionally, the Mochi was the cobbler and shoemaker of village India.

Muslim Mochi of Uttar Pradesh 
The Muslim Mochi in Uttar Pradesh are further divided into biradaris, which theoretically descend from a common ancestor.  Marriages are preferred within the biradari, with the Mochi practising both cross cousin and parallel cousin marriages. Major Mochi clans include Bagri, Barwar, Bargujar, Jadon, Jat and Shaikh. The Mochi are found in multi-caste villages, occupying their own distinct quarters. Each settlement contains a biradari pamchayat or caste council, which acts as an instrument of social control, as well as dealing with intra community disputes. The Mochi have also set up the Uttar Pradesh Muslim Mochi Sangh, which acts as a community lobbying organization. They have now been granted Other Backward Classes status, which allows them to access a number of affirmative actions schemes by the Government of India.

The community found throughout Uttar Pradesh, however the districts of Lucknow and Faizabad have a greater concentration. They speak various dialects of Hindi, such as Awadhi, although many understand Urdu. The Mochi are entirely Sunni, but like Uttar Pradesh Muslims, they are divided by the Barelvi Deobandi split.

Muslim Mochi of Punjab 

In Punjab, the word Mochi signifies a worker in tanned leather, as distinct from a tanner. The Muslim Mochi of Punjab is said to be by origin Chamar to Islam. However, the exact circumstance of their status is unclear. Historically, Muslim Mochi were found throughout Punjab with a concentration in Kasur, Lahore, Okara, Pakpattan, Faisalabad and Toba Tek Singh, but like other Muslim groups, they had to emigrate from Indian Punjab, where they were based in the Patiala and Nabha States and Hoshiarpur District at the time of partition of India. Like those of North India, the Mochi in Punjab is further divided into a number of clans, called gots from the Sanskrit gotra,  Historically, the Mochi practiced clan exogamy, but this is no longer the case, with marriages taking place with close kin. Below is a list of the other major gots:
Ballu
 Khan
Bhangar
Bero
Biswan
Jabbar
Jakhar
Jhalli
Summan
 Toor
Khillar
Mahman
Rattanpal
The Mochi in rural Punjab is still dependent on the local landlord, who acts as patron. Often, the Mochi does not own his property, but rents from the landlord. The Mochi is thus entirely dependent on the locally dominant caste, and are paid from each cash crop at the end of the harvesting season according to a system called seypi. Presently, many Mochis are no longer involved in their traditional occupation of shoemaking. Many are now landless agricultural labourers. Overall, the condition of the Mochi community in Punjab has worsened. There has been a marked shift towards manufactured shoes, which has seen a severe decline in their traditional occupation. Many of their patrons from the locally dominant castes such as the Jats no longer pay the traditional seypi. Unlike in India, the Government of Pakistan has not provided any affirmative actions programmes. As such, the Mochi are one of the most vulnerable ethnic community in Pakistan, and are often victims of societal discrimination. The Mochi are entirely Sunni and speak Punjabi.

References

Muslim communities of Uttar Pradesh
Muslim communities of India
Social groups of Uttar Pradesh
Punjabi tribes
Social groups of Bangladesh
Social groups of Pakistan
Social groups of Punjab, Pakistan